Pinsky is a Belarusian toponymic surname, and means someone from Pinsk in Belarus. When spelled Pinski; it is usually short form of the Polish and Ashkenazi Jewish surname Lapinski. It may refer to:

 Charles Pinsky, producer/director
 David Pinski (1872–1959), Yiddish-language writer
 Drew Pinsky (born 1958), American doctor, medical radio talk show host
 Leo Pinsky (born 1926), American baseball player
 Mark Pinsky (born in 1940), mathematician.
 the Pinsky phenomenon, his discovery
 Paul G. Pinsky, American politician
 Robert Pinsky (born 1940), American poet, essayist, literary critic, and translator
 Viktor Pinsky (born 1964), Russian politician

Jewish surnames